More Than a Woman is the fifth studio album by American singer Toni Braxton, released on November 18, 2002, by Arista Records. The album contained both hip hop and urban adult contemporary sounds, as well as some softer and more contemporary melodies. Throughout the project, Braxton worked with her sister Tamar and husband Keri Lewis on most of the songs, who had written and produced material for her previous album. She also worked with hip hop producers and rappers such as Irv Gotti, The Neptunes, Mannie Fresh and Loon, as well as Rodney "Darkchild" Jerkins, protégé Big Bert and his domestic partner, singer Brandy.

With More Than a Woman, Braxton continued the transition that began with previous album, The Heat (2000), which pushed her further into the progressive R&B and hip hop market and away from the adult contemporary and pop-soul background of her previous work with Babyface and L.A. Reid. During the production of her first two albums with Arista's subsidiary LaFace Records, Braxton had little control over the creative and artistic steps she took on her albums; however, after signing a new recording contract following a three-year-long dispute with LaFace, she was able to reflect her creative maturity and evolution in the album's writing and recording.

Upon release, the album was generally well received by critics, who felt it was similar to The Heat but lacked its commercial crossover appeal. More Than a Woman debuted at number thirteen on the US Billboard 200 with first week sales of 98,000 copies, becoming Braxton's lowest-charting album by then. While lead single "Hit the Freeway" reached the top 10 in Belgium and Denmark, the single and its parent album failed to impact elsewhere, resulting into lackluster sales in general. Disappointed by its performance, which Braxton attributed to the little promotion activities that the Arista management had arranged for her due to her second pregnancy, she parted with her record label due to the album's commercial failure in April 2003.

Background
In 1992, Braxton signed a solo recording contract with LaFace Records, a joint venture between the producing duo Antonio "L.A." Reid and Kenneth "Babyface" Edmonds from former recording group the Deele, and distributor Arista Records. Her first two studio albums, Toni Braxton (1993) and Secrets (1996), became critical and commercial successes and sold a combined 21 million copies, earning $170 million in worldwide sales. By late 1996, Braxton was still waiting for fair financial rewards. Her recording contract with LaFace was substantially below those of other multi-platinum artists and bound her to refund all kinds of expenses the label had financed in advance, including management fees, taxes, and video budgets, earning Braxton a $1,972 royalty check only. In December 1997, after learning that she accumulated more than $1 million in debts, Braxton became embroiled in a legal dispute with LaFace, when she filed a lawsuit asking to be freed from her long-term contractual obligations to the label in the midst of a contract renegotiation. After then being counter-sued by the label for breach of contract, the singer eventually filed for bankruptcy protection in 1998, a move that stalled all legal proceedings between the two parties.

In January 1999, Braxton mended her relationship with Reid and Babyface, when the lawsuit against LaFace was eventually settled after Braxton was awarded higher royalties, a pay raise, and publishing rights to all songs that she had co-written. Soon after, she resumed recording for The Heat, her first album in four years. In an attempt to move her away from Edmonds's formulaic ballad-driven and adult contemporary-oriented material on her previous albums to establish her relevance with a new generation of music consumers, Braxton took bigger control over the artistic steps on The Heat: She consulted a variety of writers and producers to work with her, including Rodney Jerkins, Bryan-Michael Cox, and Jazze Pha, and co-wrote seven of the 12 songs on the album. Preceded by its uptempo lead single "He Wasn't Man Enough", LaFace released The Heat in April 2000, propelling Braxton back to the top of music charts. At a worldwide sales total in excess of four million copies however, the album was less successful than its predecessors.

Composition
Braxton began work on her fifth studio album in early 2002. More Than a Woman is a diverse blend of danceable club numbers, trademark Braxton ballads and experimental tracks which borrow from the genres of rock and jazz. The album was described as a "variety of sonic colors". Her then-husband Keri Lewis, former Mint Condition keyboardist, co-wrote and had a hand in producing four tracks, while her younger sister Tamar Braxton co-wrote six songs and provides backing vocals on all tracks.

Songs

The album's first half alternates between edgy hip hop-flavored fare, the club-ready and more experimental R&B. The album opens with the "feisty" "Let Me Show You the Way (Out)". It was described as "a new woman's anthem for 2003" by BBC Music. Over a hammering hip-hop bassline, angry incessant piano chords and Braxton's calm but commanding vocals lies a telling tale of infidelity, which sets the theme for the majority of the album. The second track "Give It Back" is another hip-hop song, which features rapper Big Tymers and it is a "club-ready track". CD Universe described it as a "moody, mid-tempo track, which boasts a bit of hip-hop flavor.  The third track "A Better Man" is a "futuristic R&B ballad". The fourth track and the only single of the album "Hit the Freeway" features Loon and it's an edgy hip-hop flavored track. It was described as "a quintessential Neptunes track - melodic synthesiser, staged handclaps and funky drum patterns - later transpires into an impressive slice of pop R&B." According to BBC Music, the chorus: "Farewell my lonely one, nothing else here can be done, I don't ever wanna see you again" is eagerly contagious.

The fifth track "Lies, Lies, Lies" was written by Keri Lewis and it's "a dramatic, "he-done-me-wrong" ballad with mostly live instrumentation (including rock-charged guitar) and a background vocal arrangement featuring the Braxton sisters. Toni's vocals also provide a mix, as her gravelly tones are pit against an electric guitar. People magazine considered the track "an instant Toni classic, right up there with 'Breathe Again,' 'Let It Flow' and 'Un-Break My Heart.' The sixth track, the romantic slow jam "Rock Me, Roll Me", was described as "a splendid ode to female desire spotted with plucky violins, subtle reverb and Braxton's distinctive harmonies. The second half of the album slips back into more measured R&B. The seventh track "Selfish" is a "slow ballad" about Braxton's jealousy. The eighth track "Do You Remember When" is the only song produced by Rodney "Darkchild" Jerkins and it harks back to the smooth R&B of Braxton's self-titled debut. The ninth track "Me & My Boyfriend" boasts some Spanish guitar amid its slinky grooves. It features a sample from Tupac Shakur's 1996 cut "Me and My Girlfriend". The tenth track "Tell Me" is a sexy song about performing fantasies for one's love. The eleventh track "And I Love You" is "a requite ballad courtesy of longtime collaborator and mentor Babyface". The twelfth and final track "Always" is a tenderly honed R&B ballad with rich, multi-layered vocals, which add balance to the edgier, street-orientated tracks.

Promotion
Braxton first titled the album Amplified, but changed it to More Than a Woman in post-production to avoid confusion with hip hop artist Q-Tip's solo debut Amplified (1999). The title was ultimately inspired by the Bee Gees song of the same name (1977), which had been prominently played on Braxton's wedding dance with Keri Lewis in April 2001. Scheduled for an October 29 release before being bushed to November 19, 2002, Arista Records originally planned to back the album by a huge promotional plan, including appearances on late-night talk show The Tonight Show, the Macy's Thanksgiving Day Parade, The Wayne Brady Show, Late Night with David Letterman, an NBC Today Show outdoor concert, and the lighting of the Christmas tree at New York City's Rockefeller Center. However, in September 2002, while gearing up for the release of the album, Braxton discovered she was pregnant with her second child and she was subsequently forced to cancel many scheduled performances due to complications.

Executives at the label were reportedly frustrated with the timing of her second pregnancy since the complicated pregnancy confined her to bed rest and thus prevented her from doing the extensive promotion for More Than A Woman. Braxton, being under the impression that Arista Records treated her pregnancy "like a disease", asked to delay the album until 2003, but the label refused. As a result, the promotional campaign in support of the album was often reduced to interviews. In addition to a $675,000 television blitz, Braxton also took part in numerous online promotions with AOL, BET, VH1, Launch.com, MSN, and Oxygen. Arista also intended to work on furthering Braxton's reach with lifestyle marketing in locals as disparate as urban beauty salons and gay clubs. Because of her pregnancy, international publicity for More Than a Woman primarily consisted of a two-day event in Los Angeles in late October 2002.

Singles
In support of the album, Arista originally planned to release "No More Love", a sample-heavy track produced by and featuring former Murder Inc. Records head Irv Gotti, as the first single from More Than a Woman. However, after Gotti had leaked to a New York City radio station, Braxton and Arista decided to scrap its release and the song was subsequently excluded from the final track listing. Instead, the Neptunes-produced "Hit the Freeway", a collaboration with Bad Boy rapper Loon, was selected as the album's lead single. It peaked at number 86 on Billboard Hot 100, number 32 on the Hot R&B/Hip-Hop Songs, and number two on the Hot Dance Club Play.

"Me & My Boyfriend" was originally set to be the lead single for the album, slated for a September release, but the label decided to release "Hit the Freeway" in October instead. It was consequently planned as the album's second single, however rapper Jay-Z and singer Beyoncé imminently released their single "'03 Bonnie & Clyde", which coincidentally sampled the same beat (as well as lyrical and melodic content) from rapper Tupac Shakur's 1996 song "Me and My Girlfriend", causing Braxton to refrain from releasing her version as a single, and accusing Jay-Z of stealing her idea. Arista then settled on ballad "A Better Man" instead. Sent to radio in fall 2002, the single was left unsupported by the label, although promotional CDs were made available for radio. Additionally, to service radio shows, a double A-side vinyl for "Give It Back" and "Let Me Show You the Way (Out)" was released.

Critical reception

At Metacritic, which assigns a rated mean out of 100 from mainstream critics, the album received a score of 77, indicating "generally favorable reviews", based on eight reviews. AllMusic editor Stephen Thomas Erlewine gave to the album four stars out of five. He felt that More Than a Woman is "so consistent, so much a continuation of its predecessor, The Heat, that it may be hard to pinpoint distinctive characteristics." He complained that "it lacks a single as undeniable as "He Wasn't Man Enough" [though] much of the album is in a similar sexy spirit." He concluded the review, stating that " it was easily one of the most satisfying listens of its kind released that year, and another fine record by Toni Braxton." Blender wrote a positive review, saying that "while her wailing contemporaries go off the rails with exaggeration, Braxton merely tightens her groove and rides these mellow, meaty melodies." Chuck Arnold wrote for People that "her sultry, husky alto shines as she bends and jazzily twists notes with that special Toni touch." Arnold realized that "Although the rest of the album doesn't quite match that quality, it's still easily More than your average R&B-pop fare." Launch.com was positive towards the theme of the songs, writing that "all this anger's not just therapeutic – it also makes her transition to hard hip-hop diva seem sensible, instead of just a marketing move, by grounding it in something real."

Keysha Davis from BBC Music thought that More Than a Woman would "sell bucket-loads." She praised Braxton for serving "both middle-of-the-road listeners with her high-powered ballads, as well the comrades of the streets with her attitude-ridden take on modern day living." While discussing the album's hip hop songs, Chris Willman from Entertainment Weekly wrote that "she has sudden hip-hop pretensions, it's low-key hip-hop, the electronic throbs provides a surprisingly suitable bed for her controlled boudoir cooing." While comparing the album between her previous release The Heat, he called it "hotter than her predominantly adult contemporary previous album" and concluded writing that the album "proves to be the singer's most consistent effort" since her self-titled 1993 debut album.

Commercial performance
More Than a Woman debuted and peaked at number 13 on the US Billboard 200, selling 98,000 copies in its first week. It marked Braxton's lowest opening sales for a non-Christmas-themed studio album up to then and was a considerable decline from her previous effort The Heat, which had opened to sales of 199,000 units in 2000. On Billboards component charts, it reached number five on the Top R&B/Hip-Hop Albums chart, becoming Braxton's first solo album to miss the top spot. In total, More Than a Woman sold 438,000 copies and was eventually certified gold by the Recording Industry Association of America (RIAA) for the shipment of over 500,000 copies in the United States. Elsewhere, More Than a Woman was unable to match the commercial success of Braxton's first three studio albums. While it failed to enter most international music markets, the album reached the top 40 of the German Albums Chart and debuted at number 23 on the Swiss Albums Chart.

Braxton considered More Than a Woman a commercial "flop-flop." Disappointed by its underperformance and the little promotion activities Arista Records had arranged after releasing the first single "Hit the Freeway", Braxton requested her manager Barry Hankerson to obtain a release for her from any future recording obligations to the label. On March 14, 2003, Braxton issued a press statement saying she was leaving Arista for Hankerson's Universal-distributed Blackground Records, on which she released her sixth studio album Libra in 2005. In a 2012 interview with ABC News, Braxton expressed discontentment with the project when asked about the commercial failure of her albums from the mid-to-late 2000s: "Those albums – that's like that one-night stand that you don't want to talk about", she said. "You don't want anyone to know about those records that didn't do well. I had a few of those. Definitely a few."

Track listing

Notes
  signifies a co-producer
  signifies a vocal producer
  signifies an additional producer

Sample credits
 "Let Me Show You the Way (Out)" contains excerpts from "Love's Happening", written by Curtis Mayfield.
 "Me & My Boyfriend" contains excerpts from "Me and My Girlfriend", written by Tupac Shakur, Tyrone Wrice, Ricky Rouse, and Darryl Harper.
 "Tell Me" contains interpolations from the composition "Sweet Love", written by Anthony Bias, Anita Baker, and Louis Johnson.

Personnel
Credits adapted from the liner notes of More Than a Woman.

Musicians

 Toni Braxton – vocals, background vocals 
 No I.D. – all instruments, programming 
 Keri – arrangement ; drum programming, keyboards ; Rhodes, guitar 
 Tamar Braxton – background vocals 
 Terrence "Bearwolf" Williams – keyboards 
 Baby – rap vocals 
 Mannie Fresh – rap vocals 
 Andrea Martin – arrangement, background vocals 
 Ivan Matias – arrangement 
 Gerrard C. Baker – all instruments, programming 
 Pharrell Williams – instruments, instrument arrangements, additional vocals 
 Chad Hugo – instruments, instrument arrangements, additional vocals 
 Loon – rap vocals 
 Chris "Daddy" Dave – drums 
 Keith Lewis – guitar 
 O'Dell – guitar 
 Stokley – acoustic guitar, solo guitar, background vocals 
 Ricky Kinchen – bass 
 Blake English – guitar 
 Rodney "Darkchild" Jerkins – all music 
 Tomi Martin – guitar 
 Jeremy Lubbock – string arrangements 
 Ricky Rouse – guitar 
 Babyface – drum programming, keyboards, bass 
 Clare Fischer – orchestra arrangements, orchestra conducting 
 Robert "Big Bert" Smith – keyboards 
 Brent Fischer – orchestra arrangements, orchestra conducting ; orchestra project coordinator, orchestra management
 Assa Drori – violin
 Amy Hershberger – violin
 Joe Ketendjian – violin
 Armen Garabedian – violin
 Pat Aiken – violin
 Sally Berman – violin
 Brian Benning – violin
 Irma Neumann – violin
 Agnes Gottschewski – violin
 Phillip Levy – violin
 Rebecca Bunnell – violin
 Johana Krejci – violin
 Henry Gronnier – violin
 Dennis Molchan – violin
 Miwako Watanabe – violin
 Julie Rogers – violin
 Kazi Pitelka – viola
 Jorge Moraga – viola
 Carole Kleister-Castillo – viola
 Thomas Diener – viola
 Renita Koven – viola
 Lynn Grants – viola
 Cecilia Tasn – cello
 Maurice Grants – cello
 Dan Smith – cello
 Earl Madison – cello
 Oscar Hidalgo – contrabass
 Drew Dembowski – contrabass

Technical

 No I.D. – production 
 Keri – co-production, Pro Tools editing ; recording ; vocal production ; production ; mixing ; executive production
 Kevin "KD" Davis – mixing 
 Dion Peters – mixing assistance 
 Mannie Fresh – production 
 Mark "DJ Exit" Goodchild – recording 
 Leslie Brathwaite – mixing 
 Ivan Matias – production 
 Andrea Martin – production 
 Gerrard C. Baker – production 
 Mark Pitts – additional production 
 Victor Mancusi – recording, mixing 
 Rene Antelmann – mixing assistance 
 Kirk Lightburn – song coordination 
 The Neptunes – production 
 Andrew "Drew" Coleman – recording 
 Frannie Graham – recording assistance 
 Cedric Anderson – recording assistance 
 Phil Tan – mixing 
 John Horesco IV – mixing assistance 
 Steve Hodge – mixing 
 Larry Mah – string recording 
 Stephen Glicken – mixing assistance 
 Robert "Big Bert" Smith – production 
 Blake English – recording, mixing 
 Paul Foley – recording 
 Yen-Hue Tan – recording assistance 
 Spencer Swanson – recording assistance 
 Mike Houge – recording assistance 
 Brett Liebermann – mixing assistance 
 Rodney "Darkchild" Jerkins – production, mixing 
 Fabian Marasciullo – recording 
 Dexter Simmons – mixing 
 John Kurlander – string recording 
 Chink Santana – production 
 Irv Gotti – production 
 Brian Springer – recording, mixing 
 Babyface – production 
 Paul Boutin – recording 
 Edward Quesada – recording assistance 
 Craig Taylor – recording assistance 
 Serban Ghenea – mixing 
 Tim Roberts – mixing assistance 
 John Hanes – additional Pro Tools engineering 
 Ivy Skoff – production coordination 
 Jean-Marie Horvat – recording 
 Brent Fischer – orchestra management, orchestra project coordination
 Assa Drori – orchestra management
 Toni Braxton – executive production
 Antonio "L.A." Reid – executive production
 Herb Powers Jr. – mastering
 Allen D. Hong – project coordination
 Evelyn Beauman – project assistance

Artwork
 Richard Thomas Jennings – art direction
 Tony Duran – cover and matching interior photo
 Daniela Federici – inside photo

Charts

Weekly charts

Year-end charts

Certifications

Release history

Notes

References

2002 albums
Albums produced by Babyface (musician)
Albums produced by Chink Santana
Albums produced by Irv Gotti
Albums produced by Mannie Fresh
Albums produced by the Neptunes
Albums produced by No I.D.
Albums produced by Rodney Jerkins
Albums recorded at Capitol Studios
Albums with cover art by Tony Duran
Arista Records albums
Toni Braxton albums